The Singapore national baseball team is the national baseball team of Singapore. The team represents Singapore in international competitions.

History 
In the 2002 Asian Baseball Cup - Eastern Division held in Thailand, Singapore came in sixth.

In the 2004 Asian Baseball Cup - Eastern Division held in Thailand, Team Singapore came in fifth. They clinched their first international win, beating Team Sri Lanka 12-10.

In the 2012 Asian Baseball Cup - Eastern Division held in Thailand, Team Singapore came in fourth. They bagged their second international win against Team Myanmar, scoring 4 runs in the final inning to walk off 4-3.

In the IBAF Hong Kong International Baseball Open 2013, Team Singapore came in fifth. The tournament marked a significant milestone as they achieved a no-hit-no-run game in their final placement game against Team Shenzhen.

In the 2015 Asian Baseball Cup - Eastern Division held in Indonesia, Team Singapore came in sixth.

In the WBSC Hong Kong International Baseball Open 2017, Team Singapore came in second in the National Team category.

In the 2018 Asian Baseball Cup - Eastern Division held in Hong Kong, Team Singapore came in fifth.

In the WBSC Hong Kong International Baseball Open 2018, Team Singapore came in second in the National Team category.

In the 2019 Southeast Asian Games held in the Philippines, Singapore came in fourth. They put up a strong fight against Team Indonesia, with the score level at 4-4 in the bottom of the eighth inning.

References

External links
sbsa.org.sg
Instagram Page: https://www.instagram.com/sgmensbaseball/?hl=en

National baseball teams in Asia
Baseball
Baseball in Asia